Patricia Harrison is a British former tennis player. A native of Manchester, Harrison was active in the 1950s.

Harrison claimed ​the 1953 All England Plate and was a regular Lancashire county champion. In 1954 she became engaged to James Hugh Brown, a company director and county tennis player. Competing under her married name, she made the round of 16 at the 1956 Wimbledon Championships, which was her best performance at the tournament.

References 

Year of birth missing (living people)
Living people
British female tennis players
English female tennis players
Tennis people from Lancashire
Sportspeople from Manchester